Nir Mansour (Hebrew: ניר מנצור; born 22 January 1991 in Israel) is an Israeli footballer.

References

Association football defenders
Israeli footballers
1991 births
Living people
Ayia Napa FC players